The 2004 Indian general election in Himachal Pradesh were held for 4 seats. The Indian National Congress won 3 seats while the Bhartiya Janata Party won 1 seat.

Results

Party Wise Results

Elected MPs

See also 
Results of the 2009 Indian general election by state

Indian general elections in Himachal Pradesh
2000s in Himachal Pradesh
Himachal Pradesh